Kaeser Compressors, Inc. manufactures compressed air and vacuum products, including rotary screw compressors, oil-less reciprocating compressors, rotary lobe blowers, rotary screw blowers, high-speed turbo blowers, refrigerated and desiccant dryers, filters, condensate management systems and other related products. The company provides service, rentals, and consulting services. Kaeser Compressors, Inc. is a US affiliate of Kaeser Kompressoren headquartered in Coburg, Germany.

History
Carl Kaeser, Sr. founded the Kaeser organization as an engineering workshop that produced car and engine parts in 1919. Soon after, the factory was reconditioning engines, producing gears and building special purpose machines for the local glass industry. It wasn’t until the post-war need for compressed air in the rebuilding of Germany that the company began manufacturing and developing air compressors. The company grew rapidly after turning out its first reciprocating compressor in 1948, and by 1960 had outgrown its facility of 38 years and moved to a new location in Coburg, Germany.

Under the leadership of Carl Kaeser, Jr., Kaeser engineers developed a rotary screw compressor that featured the "Sigma Profile" air-end in the early 1970s. The first compressor to incorporate the Sigma Profile was delivered in 1975.

Now represented in every major industrialized country in the world, Kaeser established its first subsidiary in Switzerland by the late 1970s. The US subsidiary is the largest. Reiner Mueller started the US subsidiary in Fredericksburg, VA in 1982. Fredericksburg is near to several transport centers, and remains home to the US headquarters. The  site includes a  facility. Reiner Mueller retired in December 2008, and his son Frank assumed leadership in January 2009.

Carl Kaeser, Jr., who started with Kaeser Kompressoren in 1937, worked until the day he died in 2009. Thomas Kaeser assumed leadership of Kaeser Kompressoren after his father, Carl, died at the age of 95.

Kaeser’s manufacturing facilities in Europe consist of a group headquarters in Coburg, Germany that produces rotary screw, reciprocating, and portable compressors, and a plant in Gera, Germany that produces refrigeration dryers and rotary blowers. Also, the company has a sheet metal plant near Coburg in Sonnefeld.

Sigma Profile rotors
When developing the Sigma Profile in the nineteen seventies, the Kaeser engineering team was faced with overcoming the disadvantages that previous screw designs presented to the market. Those previous designs included an energy-consuming symmetrical profile, and an asymmetric design introduced in 1962 that was an improvement over the symmetrical design but still consumed more energy than a reciprocating compressor. Kaeser engineers introduced the Sigma Profile with a five-to-six lobe asymmetrical design. The design required closer tolerances between the rotors and the housing, resulting in fewer air back-flow losses.

Kaeser’s design philosophy remains to develop larger, slower running air-ends. Air-ends turning at slower speeds deliver more compressed air for the same drive power (up to 20% more efficient than conventional screw designs). Oil flooding at the point of compression provides cleaning, lubrication and cooling, which contributes to air-end efficiency.

Kaeser continues to refine and improve the air-end design up to 1000 hp.

Production
Kaeser's screw compressor rotors and air-end castings are created in climate-controlled environments. Precision milling machines mill the screw compressor rotors to fine tolerances, and CNC machining centers with pallet changing systems allow for 24-hour automatic machining of the air-end castings. A 3D coordinate-measuring machine automatically checks the critical dimensions of the air-end casing. CNC profile grinders finish the rotors to micrometre tolerances following solution hardening of the milled rotors within controlled atmosphere heat treating ovens.

Certifications, association memberships, and partnerships
 ISO 9001 Quality System Certification (US obtained certification in 1997)
 ISO 14001 Environmental Standard (US obtained certification in 1998)
 Allied Partner with the US Department of Energy (2001)
 ENERGY STAR Partner (US Partnered in 2009)
Association of Equipment Manufacturers
American Rental Association
Association of Woodworking & Furnishings Suppliers
Compressed Air and Gas Institute
Food Processing Suppliers Association
Packaging Machinery Manufacturers Institute
Plastics Industry Association
Specialty Equipment Market Association
Water Environment Federation
Woodworking Machinery Industry Association

References

Kaeser Kompressoren (1999). “Kaeser Kompressoren: 80 Years of Tradition and Progress.” Kaeser literature
Freehling, Bill (2008, November 2). “Change comes to Kaeser.” Retrieved November 3, 2008 from https://archive.today/20130123234001/http://fredericksburg.com/News/FLS/2008/112008/11022008/422108
Kaeser Kompressoren (1992). “Kaeser Compressors.” Kaeser literature
US Department of Energy Office of Energy Efficiency and Renewable Energy (2002, April). “Kaeser Compressors” Partnering for Success, 22.
Pollok, Murray (2009, August 4). “Compressor pioneer Carl Kaeser passes away.” Retrieved January 21, 2010 from http://www.khl.com/magazines/international-rental-news/detail/item41979/Compressor-pioneer%20-Carl-%20%20Kaeser-%20passes-away/
Kaeser breaks ground on new building expansion (2014)

External links
Company website

Compressed air power
Industrial equipment